Kerstin Finke (born 22 July 1966) is a German diver. She competed in two events at the 1984 Summer Olympics.

References

1966 births
Living people
German female divers
Olympic divers of West Germany
Divers at the 1984 Summer Olympics
Sportspeople from Aachen
20th-century German women